Guillermo González Camarena (17 February 1917 – 18 April 1965) was a Mexican electrical engineer who was the inventor of a color-wheel type of color television.

Early life
González Camarena was born in Guadalajara, Mexico. He was the youngest of seven siblings, among  sculptor Jorge González Camarena.

Death
He died in a car crash in Puebla on April 18, 1965 (at the age of 48), returning from inspecting a television transmitter in Las Lajas, Veracruz.

Legacy
A field-sequential color television system similar to his Tricolor system was used in NASA's Voyager mission in 1979, to take pictures and video of Jupiter.

There was a Mexican science research and technology group created La Funck Guillermo González Camarena or The Guillermo González Camarena Foundation in 1995 that  was beneficial to creative and talented inventors in Mexico.

At the same time, the IPN began construction on the Centro de Propiedad Intelectual "Guillermo González Camarena" (Guillermo González Camarena Intellectual Property Center).

External links
 Patent 2296019 Chromoscopic adapter for television equipment. Google Patents
 The Original Patent For Color Television Explained

References

1917 births
1965 deaths
History of television
Amateur radio people 
Mexican telecommunications engineers
Mexican inventors
People from Guadalajara, Jalisco
Television pioneers
Road incident deaths in Mexico
20th-century inventors
Early color television